Portsmouth Christian Academy (PCA) is a private non-denominational Christian school in Dover, New Hampshire, United States. It is the largest non-denominational Christian school in New England and is located on a  riverfront campus in Dover. The school is divided into four sections: Preschool (PCAP), Lower School (K-8), and Upper School (9-12). The Upper School is designed as a college preparatory program.

History
PCA was founded in 1979 by Pastor Peter and Mrs. Bettie Miller and was originally called Bethel Christian Academy (BCA). Based in Portsmouth, New Hampshire, BCA served kindergarten through eighth grades.

In 1992, under the new leadership of then-Headmaster Dennis Runey, the school changed its name to Portsmouth Christian Academy, and by 1995 expanded to include a high school. Jonathan Tymann was hired as the first Principal in 1996 and the first alumnus of PCA graduated in 1997. The first full graduating class was in 1998. In 1999, PCA moved to the current Dover campus and added the gym and Upper School facilities. The new facilities in Dover also provided a venue for a preschool; the first PCAP classes joined the PCA family in the fall of that year.

Curriculum 
Portsmouth Christian Academy offers a faith-based education. The school's philosophy of education is based on the classical trivium.

Dual enrollment and Advanced Placement 
PCA offers dual enrollment with Southern New Hampshire University. This allows part-time students to earn college credit and high school credit simultaneously. In addition, students may enroll in Advanced Placement courses and take the AP test to earn college credit.

Diploma options 
PCA students choose from several tracks with result in several diploma options. These include a General Education Diploma, STEM Diploma, Fine Arts Diploma, or a Diploma of Distinction, which recognizes rigorous academic work.

Student body
PCA enrolls 600+ students from New Hampshire, Maine, and Massachusetts.

Extracurricular activities

Athletics
PCA is a Division IV member of the New Hampshire Interscholastic Athletic Association (NHIAA).

References

Christian schools in New Hampshire
Private high schools in New Hampshire
Private middle schools in New Hampshire
Private elementary schools in New Hampshire
Schools in Strafford County, New Hampshire
Buildings and structures in Dover, New Hampshire